Kentucky Route 11 (KY 11) is an American highway maintained by the Kentucky Transportation Cabinet that runs from Maysville to Barbourville. The route from Maysville to Mount Sterling is being upgraded on a new alignment as part of a "macro-corridor" within the state of Kentucky.

Route description
The only part of KY 11 the Federal Highway Administration classifies as part of the National Highway System is on its concurrency with U.S. Route 25E (US 25E) in Barbourville. The Kentucky Transportation Cabinet includes KY 11 as part of the state primary classification of the state primary road system along the US 25E concurrency in Barbourville, along the portion of its US 421 overlap between Manchester and Fall Rock, from KY 30 at Levi to the Bert T. Combs Mountain Parkway at Slade, and from KY 686 in Mount Sterling to its northern terminus in Maysville. The agency classifies the remainder of KY 11 as a state secondary highway.

KY 11's route from its southern terminus in Whitley County through Knox and Clay counties to Booneville in Owsley County, is through the dissected Appalachian Plateau, a forested dissected plateau that lies to the west of the major ridges of the Appalachian Mountains and is drained by the Cumberland River to the south and the Kentucky River to the north. From Booneville to the Lee–Wolfe county line north of Beattyville, the highway passes through the Kentucky/Ohio Carboniferous Plateau, a less-rugged region with a mix of forest, pasture, and cropland drained by the Kentucky River. KY 11 continues northwest through parts of Wolfe and Powell counties through the Northern Forested Plateau Escarpment, a rugged, forested area that runs along the Pottsville Escarpment that forms the western edge of the Appalachian Plateau. The Red River, a tributary of the Kentucky River, drains that region and the Knobs–Lower Scioto Dissected Plateau, a forested region of lower hills the route passes through in Powell County that forms a ring around the Outer Bluegrass, the outer ring of the Bluegrass region. The Outer Bluegrass, which KY 71 traverses from south of Mount Sterling to its northern terminus in Maysville through Montgomery, Bath, Fleming, and Mason counties, is a region of rolling hills that is predominantly farmland. The eastern part of the Outer Bluegrass that KY 11 passes through drains to the Licking River except in Maysville, where streams flow directly into the Ohio River.

Carpenter to Manchester
KY 11 begins at an intersection with KY 92 north of the hamlet of Carpenter. The two-lane highway heads northeast along Buffalo Creek to its headwaters and crosses a ridge to the hamlet of Gausdale, where the route meets the east end of KY 779 (Maple Creek Road). KY 11 follows the Cumberland River northeast into Knox County. The highway cuts across a bend of the river, where the route crosses Little Poplar Creek and meets the north and west ends, respectively, of KY 1809 and KY 1530 (J. Logan Road). KY 11 continues through the Cumberland River valley to the city of Barbourville, which the route enters at its intersection with KY 3441 (Davis Bend Road). The route follows Main Street to the top of the bend and crosses the river into the downtown area. One block south of the Knox County Courthouse, Main Street intersects Daniel Boone Drive; KY 459 heads west on Daniel Boone Drive, KY 6 heads north on Main Street through the Barbourville Commercial District, and KY 11 turns east onto Daniel Boone Drive. KY 11 intersects KY 2421 (Cumberland Avenue) and crosses a CSX rail line immediately before the highway's junction with US 25E. The state highway runs north concurrently with the four-lane divided U.S. Highway along the railroad. The routes intersect KY 2420 (Knox Road) before KY 11 splits northeast and meets the south end of KY 2418 as the former route leaves Barbourville.

KY 11 parallels a CSX rail spur north through the valley of Little Richland Creek. The highway meets the north end of KY 3440, passes through the village of Cannon, and meets the east end of KY 3438 (Long Branch Road). KY 11 leaves Little Richland Creek and passes through Girdler, where the highway runs concurrently with KY 1304. The highway continues with the railroad through the valley of Collins Creek, where the routes pass through Woollum before entering Clay County. The highway, railroad, and Collins Fork pass through the hamlets of Cottongim and Bluehole. KY 11 crosses Engine Creek shortly before Collins Fork empties into Goose Creek. The highway intersects and joins US 421 and KY 80 on Muddy Gap Road just south of the Hal Rogers Parkway, which crosses the concurrent highways with no access southeast of Manchester.

US 421, KY 11, and KY 80 continue northwest into the city of Manchester. At Horse Creek, the highways meet the south end of KY 3480 (Old Route 421) and the west end of KY 3481 (Swafford Street). KY 80 turns south toward a diamond interchange with the parkway at a four-legged intersection with KY 2076, which follows Muddy Gap Road west. US 421 and KY 11 turn north onto four-lane divided White Street and meet the north end of KY 3481 as the two routes follow Goose Creek north into downtown Manchester. As the routes veer away from Goose Creek, they meet the west end of KY 2438 (2nd Street), the south end of KY 2440 (Main Street), and the east end of KY 687 (Town Branch Road). On the west edge of downtown, US 421 and KY 11 meet the north end of the KY 2440 (Main Street), the east end of KY 2442 (Maple Street), and the west end of KY 3472 (Memorial Drive). The highways cross Little Goose Creek at its confluence with Goose Creek and meet the east end of KY 638 as they leave Manchester on Richmond Road.

Manchester to Beattyville
US 421 and KY 11 pass Clay County High School and meet the east ends of KY 3560 (Fox Hollow Road) and KY 3473 (Island Creek–Sizemore Road) between a crossing of Island Creek. The highways meet the west end of KY 3477 (Jacks Branch Road) at Fall Rock before crossing Laurel Creek immediately before a T intersection where US 421 continues northwest along the creek and KY 11 heads east along the creek. KY 11 follows Laurel Creek to its confluence with Goose Creek at Tanksley. The highway continues northeast through Wild Cat and Hensley to the city of Oneida, where Goose Creek and the Red Bird River merge to form the South Fork Kentucky River. At a T intersection, KY 66 continues along River Street into the center of town while KY 11 turns north. KY 11 follows the valley of the South Fork Kentucky River north through Teges and into Owsley County. The highway crosses Sexton Creek and meets the east end of KY 577 at Taft, passes over Lower Island Creek and intersects the east end of KY 846 at Conkling, and bridges White Oak Creek and has a junction with KY 2025 at Southfork. KY 11 meets the east end of KY 1938 as it enters the city of Booneville on Main Street. In the center of the county seat, KY 11 turns left to join KY 30 on Church Street, which crosses Buck Creek.

West of Booneville, KY 11 and KY 30 meet the west end of KY 3504. Approaching Levi, KY 3536 splits southwest to pass through the village while KY 11 and KY 30 bypass the village and diverge, with KY 30 heading southwest and KY 11 heading north through the hamlet of Pebworth and into Lee County. KY 11 follows Long Branch north through junctions with the west end of KY 3332 and the east end of KY 587. The highway intersects the spur part of KY 3150 at Congleton and both ends of the loop part of KY 3150 at Proctor before entering the city of Beattyville. KY 11 crosses the South Fork Kentucky River, meets the north end of KY 1411 (South Fork Road), meets KY 52 at a T intersection, and turns north onto Broadway with KY 52 to cross the North Fork Kentucky River east of the confluence of the two forks to form the Kentucky River proper. In the center of town, the two routes intersect a rail line at grade, then KY 52 splits west onto Main Street while KY 11 heads north out of town.

Beattyville to Clay City
KY 11 heads through northern Lee County. The highway meets the east end of KY 498 halfway between Beattyville and Zoe, where the route intersects KY 3330 (Shoemaker Ridge Road). KY 11 meets the east end of KY 1036 at Zachariah at the Lee–Wolfe county line and the west end of KY 715 a little to the north. The highway closely follows the Middle Fork of the Red River from its headwaters northwest into Powell County. KY 11 continues through the Red River Gorge and through Natural Bridge State Resort Park on its way to Slade, where the highway has a diamond interchange with the Bert T. Combs Mountain Parkway. Immediately to the north of the interchange, KY 11 turns west and joins KY 15 on Campton Road. The two highways head west through the valley of the Middle Fork Red River, parallel to the parkway, through junctions with KY 77 (Nada Tunnel Road) at Nada, KY 1639 (South Fork Road) at the confluence of the South and Middle forks of the Red River, and KY 613 (North Fork Road) at Bowen at the confluence of the Middle Fork with the North Fork to form the Red River proper.

KY 11 and KY 15 continue west through Rosslyn, where the routes meet KY 3354 (Cat Creek Road) and KY 1184 (Cane Creek Road) and cross to the north side of the parkway. The highways pass through the city of Stanton on College Avenue. In the center of the city, KY 11 and KY 15 intersect KY 213 (Main Street); the routes also have junctions with KY 2483 (Sipple Street) and KY 2486 (Washington Street). The highways cross Judy Creek and meet the south end of KY 2073 (Halls Lane) as they head west out of town. KY 11 and KY 15 follow Stanton Road to Clay City, where they follow Main Street. In the east end of town, the highways meet the east end of KY 2480 (10th Avenue), the north end of KY 1057 (11th Street), and KY 2026 (9th Street) and pass by the Clay City National Bank Building. KY 11 and KY 15 continue by the south end of KY 2479 (3rd Street) and diverge near the west end of town after KY 11 crosses the Red River for the last time.

Clay City to Mount Sterling

KY 11 heads north out of Clay City along Black Creek Road, which follows Black Creek to its headwaters east of Pilot Knob State Nature Preserve at the Powell–Montgomery county line. The highway, now named Levee Road, meets the south end of KY 3363 (Sawmill Road) and follows Hog Creek north to Levee, where the route briefly runs concurrently with KY 646 (Nest Egg Road to the west, Cream Alley Road to the east). KY 11 continues along Lulbegrud Creek to Bogy-Chennault, where the route has another short overlap with KY 646, which heads west along Kiddville Road and east along Tonkin Road. The highway starts to follow Hinkston Creek as it approaches the city of Mount Sterling, which the highway enters at its junction with the Mount Sterling bypass road, KY 686 (Indian Mound Drive).

KY 11 meets the east end of KY 2348 (Calk Avenue) one block before its junction with US 460 (Camargo Road), which the state-numbered highway joins to head toward the center of town. The routes cross Hinkston Creek and enter the Mount Sterling Commercial District on Bank Street, which passes to the west of the historic Chesapeake and Ohio Depot. US 460 and KY 11 turn east on Main Street to join US 60 and KY 713 for one block before the former set of highways turn north onto Maysville Street. North of downtown, the highways meet the south end of KY 1991 (Hinkston Pike). US 460 and KY 11 meet the north end of KY 686 a few blocks south of their diamond interchange with I-64. US 460 and KY 11 diverge at the north city limit of Mount Sterling, with US 460 heading west on Paris Road and KY 11 continuing north on Maysville Road.

Mount Sterling to Maysville
KY 11 passes to the east of the village of Judy while Old Maysville Road passes through; KY 11 intersects KY 537 (Van Thompson Road) on the village bypass. North of Judy, the highway crosses Hinkston Creek and enters Bath County. KY 11 follows Town Branch north from the county line; the route meets the west end of KY 3289 (Springfield Road) and intersects KY 1198 (Rich Lan Road), which runs concurrently with KY 11 to Sharpsburg. KY 11 bypasses the populated part of town; while passing through the fringe, KY 1198 splits east onto Camp Street into the center of town. North of Sharpsburg, KY 11 meets KY 36; the two highways overlap north to midway between Sharpsburg and Bethel, where KY 36 splits northwest onto Moorefield Road. West of Bethel, KY 1106 splits onto Bethel Ridge Road to the center of the village while KY 11 bypasses the village. At Sherburne, the highway crosses the Licking River and enters Fleming County while on a concurrency with KY 1325, which follows East Fork Road south of the river and Three Mile Run Road north of the river.

KY 11 enters Fleming County on Mount Sterling Road, which passes through the hamlet of Conford on its way to Tilton. Tilton Road splits northeast to pass through the center of the village while KY 11 bypasses it. Tilton Road carries KY 1336 at the south junction and KY 2081 at the north junction; in between, KY 11 meets the west end of KY 156 (Poplar Plains Road). North of Tilton, the highway crosses Fleming Creek and Cassidy Creek as it approaches Flemingsburg. At the south city limit, KY 11 intersects KY 32 (Morehead Road); KY 11 Business continues on Mount Sterling Road toward downtown Flemingsburg while KY 11 joins KY 32 heading northwest on the Bypass Road. On the west side of the city, the bypass intersects Elizaville Avenue. KY 32 and KY 57 head west on Elizaville Avenue, KY 32 Business and KY 57 Business head east on the avenue toward the center of town, and KY 11 and KY 57 continue north on the bypass. KY 11 and KY 57 intersect KY 559 (Helena Pike) before the bypass intersects Maysville Road. From that intersection, KY 11 Business heads south toward downtown, KY 57 continues east on the Bypass Road, and KY 11 heads north toward Mason County.

KY 11 enters Mason County at Weedonia, where the route meets the east end of KY 324 (Helena Road). The route meets the west end of KY 597 (Mount Gilead Road) and passes Fleming-Mason Airport on its way to Marshall, where KY 11 curves east to bypass the village of Lewisburg. The road through Lewisburg is designated KY 3170 on the south end and KY 419 on the north end; between the intersections, KY 11 crosses the North Fork Licking River and bridges Strodes Run Pike and a CSX rail line. At the south city limit of Maysville, the highway intersects and briefly runs concurrently with KY 1448 (Maple Leaf Road) to KY 9 (AA Highway), where KY 1448 turns east. KY 11 follows Limestone Creek as the stream descends to the Ohio River. The highway reaches its northern terminus at US 62 and KY 10, which follow Coughlin Boulevard either west uphill or north downhill into downtown Maysville.

Major intersections

Business routes

Flemingsburg business route

Kentucky Route 11 Business (KY 11 Bus.) is an  business route through Flemingsburg in central Fleming County. KY 11 Bus. begins at a four-legged intersection with KY 11 and KY 32 at the south city limit of Flemingsburg. From the junction, KY 11 heads south on Mount Sterling Road, KY 32 heads east on Morehead Road, and KY 11 and KY 32 head west on the Bypass Road. KY 11 Bus. heads north on Mount Sterling Avenue, which meets the south end of KY 2305 (Clark Street), crosses Town Branch, and enters the Flemingsburg Historic District. Mount Sterling Avenue ends at Water Street and continues as Fox Spring Avenue; from this intersection, KY 559 heads northeast on Fox Spring Avenue, KY 32 Bus. heads southeast on Water Street, and KY 11 Bus., KY 32 Bus., and KY 559 head northwest on Water Street. At the highways intersection with Main Cross Street, which carries KY 57 Bus., KY 32 Bus. turns southwest onto Main Cross Street. KY 11 Bus. and KY 559 pass the Thomas W. Fleming House in downtown and First Presbyterian Church at their intersection with KY 2504 (West Main Street). Near the north city limit, KY 11 Bus. and KY 559 diverge, onto Helena Road and Maysville Road, respectively, at an oblique intersection; KY 2508 (Stockyard Road) connects the two roads north of their split. At the north city limit, KY 11 Bus. ends at the Bypass Road, which carries KY 11 and KY 57 west and KY 57 east; Maysville Road continues north as KY 11.

Major intersections

References

External links
KentuckyRoads.com KY 11

0011
0011
0011
0011
0011
0011
0011
0011
0011
0011
0011
0011